Vicarstown, historically known as Ballynevicar, Ballyvicar and Ballyvicary, is a village in County Laois, Ireland. It stands at the point where the R427 regional road crosses the Grand Canal.

Sport
Annanough (Áth na nEac in Irish) is the local Gaelic football team.

Vicarstown is the location of the only parkrun in County Laois.

Facilities
The village has a Catholic church, a community hall and a Gaelic Athletic Association field.  The village also has a bar and a place to rent canal barges.

Notable people
 Henry Grattan, the orator and politician, having been awarded £50,000 by the Irish Parliament in 1782 to purchase lands, bought property in this area from the Cosby family of Stradbally.
 Patrick Noel Turley, rugby player who was capped for Ireland against England in 1962. Was later not allowed to play GAA for local team.

See also
 List of towns and villages in Ireland

References

Towns and villages in County Laois
Townlands of County Laois